Alejandro Yemenidjian (born 27 December 1955), also known as Alex Yemenidjian, is Chairman of the Board of Armenco Capital, LLC.

Life and career
Alex Yemenidjian is of Armenian ethnicity, and was born in Buenos Aires, Argentina. His maternal grandparents lived in Van, Ottoman Empire and during the Armenian genocide, they fled to Argentina. His paternal grandparents were from the Gallipoli Peninsula in Turkey, and they escaped during the Armenian genocide to Greece and then ultimately settled in Argentina. Yemenidjian's father was a shoemaker in Buenos Aires. In 1968, Alex Yemenidjian and his family moved to the United States when he was a teenager. After attending Ferrahian Armenian School, Yemenidjian attained a bachelor's degree in business administration and accounting from California State University, Northridge, a master's degree in business taxation from the University of Southern California, and was adjunct professor of taxation at the USC Graduate School of Business.

Yemenidjian was a co-owner and served as Chairman of the Board and Chief Executive Officer of Tropicana Las Vegas Hotel & Casino, Inc. from July 2009 to September 2015.

He served as chairman of the board and chief executive officer of Metro-Goldwyn-Mayer (MGM Studios) Inc., from April 1999 to April 2005 and was a director from November 1997 to April 2005.

Yemenidjian also served as a director of MGM Resorts International, Inc. ("MGM") (formerly MGM Grand, Inc. and MGM Mirage Resorts, Inc.) from 1989 to 2005. From July 1995 through December 1999, Yemenidjian served as president of MGM. He also served MGM in other capacities during this period, including as chief operating officer from June 1995 until April 1999 and as chief financial officer from May 1994 to January 1998.

Yemenidjian served as an executive of Tracinda Corporation, the majority owner of both Metro-Goldwyn-Mayer Inc. and MGM, from January 1990 to January 1997 and from February 1999 to April 1999.

Prior to 1990, Yemenidjian was the managing partner of Parks, Palmer, Turner & Yemenidjian, certified public accountants.

Mr. Yemenidjian is non-executive chairman of the board and chairman of the compensation committee of Guess?, Inc., a worldwide retailer of contemporary apparel, a trustee of Baron Investment Funds Trust and Baron Select Funds, both mutual funds, Inc.

Yemenidjian is married to Arda and has a son, a daughter, and 5 grandchildren.

References

External links
http://www.regmovies.com/

1957 births
Living people
American accountants
American chief executives of travel and tourism industry companies
American film studio executives
American people of Armenian descent
Argentine emigrants to the United States
Argentine people of Armenian descent
Armenian businesspeople
California State University, Northridge alumni
American chief financial officers
Chief operating officers
Metro-Goldwyn-Mayer executives
People from Buenos Aires
Marshall School of Business alumni
University of Southern California faculty
20th-century American businesspeople